Kenneth Charles Sutherland (born 23 April 1943) is a former Belizean cyclist. He competed in the sprint event at the 1968 Summer Olympics.

References

External links
 

1943 births
Living people
Belizean male cyclists
Commonwealth Games competitors for British Honduras
Cyclists at the 1966 British Empire and Commonwealth Games
Olympic cyclists of British Honduras
Cyclists at the 1968 Summer Olympics
People from Belize City